The national symbols of Turkmenistan are defined in Article 14 of the Constitution of Turkmenistan. They consist of the Flag, the Coat of Arms, and the National Anthem. Online copies of them are available on the website of the Assembly of Turkmenistan, or Mejlis.

The National Anthem of Independent Neutral Turkmenistan 

These lyrics are the original text written by Saparmurat Niyazov (Turkmenbashy), before the changes introduced by Turkmenistan's Parliament in December 2008, replacing all references to Turkmenbashy with the people.

References